The United States Attorney for the District of South Dakota is the United States Attorney responsible for representing the federal government in the United States District Court for the District of South Dakota.
By statute, the U.S. Attorney is responsible for prosecuting both federal crimes and all serious crimes committed by adults in the District of South Dakota. Therefore, the U.S. Attorney for the South Dakota serves as both the federal prosecutor (as in the other 92 U.S. Attorneys' offices) and as the local district attorney.  the Acting United States Attorney is Dennis R. Holmes.

List of U.S. Attorneys for the District of South Dakota

See also
University of South Dakota School of Law
Attorney General of South Dakota
South Dakota Supreme Court

References

South Dakota law
Sioux Falls, South Dakota
Rapid City, South Dakota
Pierre, South Dakota
Brown County, South Dakota
1889 establishments in South Dakota
Courthouses in South Dakota
University of South Dakota School of Law alumni